The Incorporated Trustees of the Islamic Community Fund of Hong Kong is an organisation recognised by the Government of Hong Kong that represents the interests of the Muslim communities in Hong Kong. It is generally known as The Board of Trustees among local Muslims. The board office is located at the Ammar Mosque.

The board manages the Jamia Mosque, Ammar Mosque, Chai Wan Mosque and Kowloon Mosque and also the Cape Collinson Muslim Cemetery and Happy Valley Muslim Cemetery.

History
The certificate of incorporation for the trustees was issued on 1 December 1970 and the trustees is recognised by the Government of Hong Kong as the main body representing the interests of the Muslim communities in Hong Kong.

Main functions
 To manage the mosques and Muslim cemeteries in Hong Kong
 To control the subscribed, donated and bequeathed funds
 To make all arrangements for funerals and burials of deceased Muslims
 To organise prayers for special occasions, e.g. Eid al-Fitr
 To undertake any other actions in the general interests of the Hong Kong Muslims and propagation of Islam

Organisations affiliated to the trustees
 Islamic Union of Hong Kong
 Pakistan Association of Hong Kong
 Hong Kong Dawoodi Bohra Association
 Indian Muslim Association of Hong Kong

See also
 Islam in China
 Islam in Hong Kong
 Islamic Association of China
 Chinese Muslim Association

References

External links
 

1970 establishments in Hong Kong
Islamic organisations based in Hong Kong
Islamic organizations established in 1970
Wan Chai